Candidatus Rhabdochlamydia is a genus of intracellular bacteria and the sole genus in the family Candidatus Rhabdochlamydiaceae. As a Candidatus taxon, no-one has yet managed to culture them in vitro for deposition in a culture collection.

Two Rhabdochlamydia species have been characterized and validly proposed. Their ribosomal RNA genes are 96.3% identical. These gene sequences are 82%–87% identical to those of most Chlamydiales. These data and analysis of Rhabdochlamydia morphology indicates that these species belong to the bacterial order Chlamydiales.

Species 
The genus consists of the following two valid species:

 Candidatus Rhabdochlamydia crassificans Kostanjšek et al. 2004 – detected in the cockroach Blatta orientalis
 Candidatus Rhabdochlamydia porcellionis Corsaro et al. 2006 – detected in hepatopancreas of the woodlouse Porcellio scaber

See also 
 List of bacteria genera
 List of taxa with candidatus status

References 

Chlamydiota
Bacteria genera
Candidatus taxa